The Fall of the Louse of Usher is a 2002 British arthouse horror comedy film written and directed by Ken Russell. The film is loosely based on several Edgar Allan Poe stories, notably the 1839 short story "The Fall of the House of Usher".

Plot
Rock star Roddy Usher (played by James Johnston) is confined to an insane asylum after murdering his wife. During his time there he is given various shock treatments by Nurse Smith (Marie Findley) and Dr Calahari (Ken Russell), resulting in a series of bizarre and nightmarish adventures.

Style
The Fall of the Louse of Usher features many of Russell's trademarks including sexuality (often taken to extremes such as the showing of an inflatable doll orgy sequence), musical sequences and over-the-top acting. The film incorporates musical and comedy elements, with scenes exaggerating the cheapness of the props, despite primarily being a horror film.

Reception
Critics generally agreed that the film was not as polished as Russell's earlier work. For example, Paul Higson of The Zone website called the production design "kindergarten level".

References

External links
 
 
 

British comedy horror films
2002 films
Films based on horror novels
Films based on The Fall of the House of Usher
Films directed by Ken Russell
2002 comedy horror films
Films set in psychiatric hospitals
2002 comedy films
2000s English-language films
2000s British films